Milo Talbot is the name of:

Milo Talbot (British Army officer) (1854-1931)
Milo Talbot, 7th Baron Talbot of Malahide (1912-1973), son of the above